Al Rankin (born c. 1947) was a Canadian football player who played for the Calgary Stampeders, Saskatchewan Roughriders and BC Lions. He won the Grey Cup with Calgary in 1971. He played junior football with the Saskatoon Hilltops.

References

1940s births
Living people
Calgary Stampeders players
Saskatchewan Roughriders players
BC Lions players
Canadian football wide receivers